{{Infobox rail line
|name             = Yilan Line
|color            = 00a0e9
|native_name      = 宜蘭線
|native_name_lang = zh-tw
|image            = TRA Yilan Line.svg
|type             = Passenger/freight rail
|start            = Badu
|end              = Su'ao
|stations         = 27
|open             = 1924-11-30
|owner            = Taiwan Railways Administration
|operator         = Taiwan Railways Administration
|tracks          = 2
|gauge            = 
|linelength       = 
|electrification               = 25 kV/60 Hz Catenary
|speed            = 
|map_state        = collapsed
|map              = {{BS-map|inline=1

{{BS3||KBHFe||93.6|Su-ao}}

}}
}}
The Yilan Line''' is the northern section of the Eastern Line of the Taiwan Railways Administration in Taiwan. It has a length of 95 km.

History 
This railroad was completed in 1924 as the Giran-sen during Imperial Japanese rule over Taiwan. It was expanded to two tracks in the early 1980s. In 2000, it was electrified between Badu and Luodong, while the remaining part was completed in 2003. On 4 December 2020, a landslide buried a section of the line between Houtong and Ruifang Station in Ruifang District, resulting in the rail service disruption along the line. Emergency work was then carried out to remove the 10,000 m3 debris and to restore the overhead line. On 14 December, the line was fully reopened for service.

Stations 

 The Shen'ao Line runs for both freight and passenger service.

See also
 North-link line
 Taitung line
 South-link line

References

1924 establishments in Taiwan
3 ft 6 in gauge railways in Taiwan
Railway lines opened in 1924
TRA routes